Nirmal Purja (known as Nims or Nimsdai)  (born 25 July 1983) is a Nepal-born naturalised British mountaineer and a holder of multiple mountaineering world records. Prior to taking on a career in mountaineering, he served in the British Army with the Brigade of Gurkhas followed by the Special Boat Service (SBS), the special forces unit of the Royal Navy. Purja is notable for having climbed all 14 eight-thousanders (peaks above ) in a record time of six months and six days with the aid of bottled oxygen. He was also the first to reach the summits of Mount Everest, Lhotse and Makalu within 48 hours. In 2021, Purja, along with a team of nine other Nepalese mountaineers, completed the first-ever winter ascent of K2.

Early life
Nirmal ("Nims") Purja was born in July 1983 in Dana, a small village in Nepal's Myagdi district near Dhaulagiri, at 1,600 m above sea level.  At age 4, his family moved lower down to the Chitwan District near Kathmandu.  His father was a Gurkha soldier and his mother was from a farming background.  Being from two different Nepalese castes, their marriage was frowned upon and they were cut off financially and socially from their respective families.  Purja told National Geographic, "We came from a really poor family", and "As a kid, I remember I didn’t even have flip-flops".  His three much older brothers became Gurkha soldiers and they funded Purja to attend an English-speaking boarding school.  During his schooling, Purja became proficient in kick-boxing.

Military career (2003–18) 
Purja joined the Brigade of Gurkhas in 2003, and was accepted into the Royal Navy's Special Boat Service (SBS) in 2009, becoming the first Gurkha to join the elite British unit. He served in the Special Boat Service as a cold-weather warfare specialist. Ministry of Defence regulations prohibit Purja from discussing his activities with the SBS, however he said that he was involved in all theatres of war that Britain was involved in, and he was wounded after taking a sniper bullet that missed his neck by striking the butt of the stock of his rifle.

In 2018, he passed on a surprise invitation to join the Special Air Services (SAS) unit, and resigned from the SBS as a Lance Corporal, in order to focus full-time on his high-altitude mountaineering career and projects.  At the time, Purja had become an important contributor to his family while serving in the military, and was passing up his army pension (which he called "a life-changing" amount of money).

Climbing career (2012–present)

Early Himalayan ascents
He made his first major Himalayan climb in 2012, reaching the summit of Lobuche East without any previous experience as a mountaineer. On 18 May 2014, he made his first ascent of an eight-thousander by summiting Dhaulagiri (8,167 metres) during a return trip of only 15 days. On 13 May 2016, Purja summited Mount Everest, his second eight-thousander.

On 15 May 2017, Purja led the Gurkha Expedition "G200E", which summited Everest together with 13 Gurkhas to commemorate 200 years of Gurkha service in the British Army. He has ascended Mount Everest six times: the third time 27 May 2017, the fourth time 22 May 2019, the fifth time 31 May 2021 and the sixth time 15 May 2022.

On 9 June 2018, he was appointed a Member of the Order of the British Empire (MBE) by Queen Elizabeth II for his outstanding work in high altitude mountaineering.

Project Possible 14/7

With a plan to complete all 14 eight-thousand metre summits in seven months, Purja summited the first mountain on 23 April 2019 and completed the first six-summit phase of his "Project Possible 14/7" on 24 May 2019: Annapurna, Dhaulagiri, Kangchenjunga, Mount Everest, Lhotse and Makalu. He climbed with Sherpas Mingma Gyabu “David” Sherpa, Lakpa Dendi (Zekson Son), Geljen Sherpa and Tensi Kasang, amongst other mountaineers. The last five summits were climbed in only 12 days. He broke his previous Guinness World Record by climbing Mount Everest, Lhotse, and Makalu within 2 days and 30 minutes.

Purja completed the second phase in July 2019, climbing Nanga Parbat (8126 m, 3 July), Gasherbrum I (8080 m, 15 July), Gasherbrum II (8034 m, 18 July), K2 (8611 metres, 24 July) and Broad Peak (8047 m, 26 July), all in Pakistan.

The third and last phase started in September 2019. He summitted Cho Oyu (8188 m, Tibet, China) on 23 September and Manaslu (8163 m, Nepal) on 27 September. On 1 October 2019, Chinese authorities agreed to grant Purja and his team a special permit to scale Shishapangma (8027 m, Tibet, China) in the autumn season, at the request of the Nepali government. Purja left Nepal for Tibet on 18 October 2019, leading a five-member expedition to climb the mountain and completed Project Possible 14/7 with a successful summit on 29 October using supplemental oxygen.

Other than the fastest ascent with supplemental oxygen of the 14 tallest mountains in the world, Purja broke the following records: most 8000 m mountains in the Spring season, climbing six; most 8000 m mountains in the Summer season, climbing five; fastest summit of the three highest mountains in the world, Everest, K2 and Kangchenjunga; fastest summit of the five highest mountains in the World, Everest, K2, Kangchenjunga, Lhotse and Makalu; fastest lower 8000ers, Gasherbrum 1, 2 and Broad Peak; fastest higher 8000ers, consecutive summits of Everest, Lhotse and Makalu in 48 hours (beats his own previous record of 5 days).

Whilst attempting Project Possible in May 2019, a photo taken by Purja of the overcrowding on Mount Everest went viral and was shown in The New York Times.

Project Possible has been documented as a Netflix Documentary called 14 Peaks: Nothing Is Impossible which was launched on 29 November 2021.

First winter ascent of K2 
Nirmal Purja, along with nine other Nepali mountaineers, made history on 16 January 2021 as the first to ascend K2 in the harsh weather conditions of the winter. His team consisting of Mingma David Sherpa, Mingma Tenzi Sherpa, Geljen Sherpa, Pem Chiri Sherpa, Dawa Temba Sherpa and himself, joined by the team of Mingma Gyalje Sherpa (Mingma G), Dawa Tenjin Sherpa and Kilu Pemba Sherpa, and Sona Sherpa from Seven Summits Treks and successfully ascended K2 at 16:58 local time in Pakistan. This is the first successful K2 winter expedition after numerous attempts since 1987. Purja was the only team member to summit without the use of supplemental oxygen, becoming the first person to do so in winter.

After terrible weather conditions hit the lower camps at the foot of K2 and some equipment was lost, Nepali mountaineers of these three teams decided to join efforts and climb the peak together, as a team.

Further achievements 
In May 2022, Purja set a new speed record for ascending Kangchenjunga, Mount Everest, and Lhotse consecutively without oxygen, with a time of 8 days 23 hours, and 10 minutes. He ascended Kangchenjunga on May 7 at 10:50 am, Mount Everest on May 15 at 8 am (his sixth ascent of Mount Everest), and after 26 hours, on May 16, at 10 am, ascended Lhotse.

Ascents of eight-thousanders 
Research published in 2022 could only verify three climbers, including Purja, (the other two being Ed Viesturs and Veikka Gustafsson), to have stood on the true geographical summit of all 14 eight-thousanders. The researchers noted that during Project 14/7, Purja had stopped at the rocky fore summit of Dhaulagiri, and also at the ridge point on Manaslu.  However, they noted that Purja had corrected this in autumn 2021 when he went to the true summits of both mountains.

The following table lists all of Purja's ascents of eight-thousander peaks:

Personal life
Purja is of Magar descent. He was raised as a Hindu. He is married to Suchi Purja (the daughter of a Gurkha soldier), and they live in Hampshire. Purja has three much older brothers (who were also all Gurkha soldiers).

Filmography

Books

See also
Death zone, area above 8,000 metres
Kim Chang-ho (climber), previous holder of world speed record for all 14 eight-thousanders
List of climbers and mountaineers

References

External links
"Project Possible 14/7" official webpage
"K2 Winter Ascent" official webpage

1984 births
Living people
Gurkhas
Nepalese emigrants to the United Kingdom
British people of Nepalese descent
Nepalese mountain climbers
British mountain climbers
British summiters of Mount Everest
Nepalese summiters of Mount Everest
Summiters of all 14 eight-thousanders
People from Myagdi District
Special Boat Service personnel
Nepalese Hindus
British Hindus